Zhu Zhaoliang (21 August 1932 – 30 January 2022) was a Chinese scientist and politician who was a researcher at the Institute of Soil Science, Chinese Academy of Sciences (ISSAS), a vice president of the Jiangsu Provincial Committee of the Chinese People's Political Consultative Conference, and an academician of the Chinese Academy of Sciences. He was a member of the Standing Committee of the 9th and 10th Chinese People's Political Consultative Conferences.

Biography
Zhu was born in Qingdao, Shandong, on 21 August 1932, while his ancestral home was in Fenghua, Zhejiang. In 1949, he was accepted by Shandong University, where he successively studied at the Department of Agronomy and Department of Chemistry. After graduating in 1953, he was despatched to the Institute of Soil Science, Chinese Academy of Sciences (ISSAS), where he was promoted to associate research fellow in May 1978 and to research fellow in June 1986. In February 1994, he joined the Chinese Peasants' and Workers' Democratic Party, and became its vice chairman in October 1997. In February 1998, he was proposed as vice chairman of the Jiangsu Provincial Committee of the Chinese People's Political Consultative Conference. He died in Nanjing, Jiangsu on 30 January 2022, at the age of 89.

Honours and awards
 1993 Member of the Chinese Academy of Sciences (CAS)

References

Bibliography
 

1932 births
2022 deaths
People from Qingdao
Scientists from Shandong
Shandong University alumni
Chinese agronomists
Members of the Chinese Academy of Sciences
Chinese Peasants' and Workers' Democratic Party politicians
People's Republic of China politicians from Shandong
Members of the Standing Committee of the 9th Chinese People's Political Consultative Conference
Members of the Standing Committee of the 10th Chinese People's Political Consultative Conference